Eve's footprint is the popular name for a set of fossilized footprints discovered on the shore of Langebaan Lagoon, South Africa in 1995. They are thought to be those of a female human and have been dated to approximately 117,000 years ago. This makes them the oldest known footprints of an anatomically-modern human. The estimated age of Eve's footprint means that the individual who left the tracks in the soil, thought to be female, would have lived within the current wide range of estimates for the date of Mitochondrial Eve.

History
The three footprints were found in 1995 by geologist David Roberts from the Council for Geoscience and announced at a press conference with paleoanthropologist Lee R. Berger of the University of the Witwatersrand at Johannesburg, South Africa, at the National Geographic Society in Washington, D.C. The discovery was documented in the August, 1997, issue of the South African Journal of Science.

Berger and Roberts say the prints were made on a steep sand dune during a turbulent rainstorm. The location where they were found is in southwest South Africa about 60 to 70 miles (about 100 kilometres) northwest of Cape Town in the West Coast National Park. They were found in a ledge of sandstone at the edge of Langebaan Lagoon near the Atlantic coast. The preserved prints were moved to the South African Museum in Cape Town for protection and a concrete replica was mounted on the shores of Langebaan.

The maker of the footprints lived in the time of the emergence of modern Homo sapiens, or people anatomically similar to humans alive today. The footprints measure  in length and are about the size of a modern-day (U.S.) woman's size 7½ shoe (British size 6, continental European size 39½). In one foot impression the big toe, ball, arch, and heel clearly are discernible. He said that the woman who made these footprints would resemble a contemporary woman.

Fewer than three dozen hominid fossils from the period 100,000 to 200,000 years ago have been found. Berger said, "These footprints are traces of the earliest modern people." Roberts explained further that dry sand blew over the wet footprints and filled the prints. The sand and accompanying crushed seashells hardened like cement into sedimentary rock and protected the footprints.

The team later found associated evidence of stone tool use (a core, scrapers, cutting blades, and a spear point) in the same area that is believed to date from the same period. There also was evidence of the use of ochre, leading to the intriguing possibility that the 'Eve' of 117,000 years ago may have been wearing the colorful powder.

See also
 Ancient footprints of Acahualinca – late Holocene human footprints found near the shore of Lake Managua in Nicaragua, dating to approximately 2,120 years ago.
 Happisburgh footprints – early Pleistocene fossilized hominid footprints found in a sediment layer on a beach at Happisburgh in Norfolk, England, dating to more than 800,000 years ago, 
 Ileret – footprints of Homo erectus found at Ileret, Northern Kenya, dating to approximately 1.5 million years ago.
 Laetoli footprints – a line of hominid footprints, discovered at Laetoli, Tanzania by Mary Leakey in 1976, dating to approximately 3.6 million years ago.
 List of fossil sites (with link directory)
 List of hominina (hominid) fossils (with images)

References

Citations

Sources cited
 Berger, Lee R. et al., In the Footsteps of Eve: The Mystery of Human Origins, National Geographic Society (2000), 
 Wade, Nicholas, The New York Times Book of Archaeology, The Lyons Press (2001),

External links
 Human Timeline (Interactive) – Smithsonian, National Museum of Natural History (August 2016).

Homo sapiens fossils
Paleoanthropological sites
Fossil trackways
1995 archaeological discoveries
Archaeological discoveries in South Africa
Archaeology of Southern Africa
Archaeological history of Southern Africa